George Hay, 5th Earl of Kinnoull (died 1687) was a Scottish peer and soldier.

Biography

He was the eldest son of William Hay, 4th Earl of Kinnoull, the fourth Earl of Kinnoull, and his second wife, Lady Catherine, daughter of Charles Cecil, Viscount Cranborne. His date of birth is not recorded, but his father's first wife died in 1665.

He succeeded to the earldom in 1677 after his father's death. He served in the Imperial Army, fighting against the Ottoman Empire.

He died, unmarried, in Hungary a decade later.

Upon his death the earldom passed to his younger brother,  William Hay.

References

1687 deaths
05